Mary Elizabeth Greenwood (10 March 1873 – 28 July 1961) was a New Zealand photographer. She was an early promoter of the autochrome photographic process in New Zealand. Her work is held by the Museum of New Zealand Te Papa Tongarewa and by the National Library of New Zealand.

Biography
Greenwood owned and operated a commercial photographic studio, Elizabeth Greenwood Studios, on Woodward Street in Wellington. Much of her work involved taking society and portrait photographs.  Greenwood was also a member of the Wellington Camera Club and judged photographic competitions and gave lectures.  In 1908 Greenwood was interviewed by a reporter of the Dominion newspaper on the autochrome photographic process. She gave the reporter a demonstration of the new technique.  

Although the whereabouts of much of her photographic material and autochrome plates is unknown, the Museum of New Zealand Te Papa Tongarewa and the National Library of New Zealand hold several pieces of her work.

Family 
Greenwood's father was Frederick Daw Greenwood, who was the brother of Ellen Sarah Greenwood. Greenwood's grandfather was John Danforth Greenwood who was married to the New Zealand artist, letter-writer and teacher Sarah Greenwood. Her great great grandfather is the early American portrait painter John Greenwood. Greenwood took a portrait photograph of her aunt which she donated to the Levin Memorial Home in commemoration of her aunt's charitable work.

References

1873 births
1961 deaths
New Zealand photographers
New Zealand women photographers
People from Wellington City